KYCM (89.9 FM) is a radio station licensed to serve Alamogordo, New Mexico.  The station is owned by Your Christian Companion Network, Inc.  It airs a Religious radio format.

The station was assigned the KYCM call letters by the Federal Communications Commission on May 26, 2006.

References

External links
KYCM's website

YCM